Echoes may refer to:
 Echo (phenomenon)

Film and television
 Echoes (2014 film), an American supernatural horror film
 Echoes (miniseries), a 2022 Netflix original drama series
 "Echoes" (Fear Itself), an episode of Fear Itself
 "Echoes" (Stargate Atlantis), a 2006 episode of Stargate Atlantis
 "Echoes" (Dollhouse), an episode of Dollhouse
 Echoes (Boogiepop), a character in Boogiepop
 "Echoes", an episode of the television series Hawkeye
 Echoes, a TV series based on the novel by Maeve Binchy
 Echoes, the 2007 series finale episode of Code Lyoko
 Echoes, a film starring Mercedes McCambridge

Literature
 Echoes (Binchy novel), a 1985 novel by Maeve Binchy
 Echoes (Steel novel), a 2005 novel by Danielle Steel
 Echoes (Time Hunter), a Time Hunter novella
 Echoes (comics), a comic book limited series by Top Cow Productions
 Les Echos (disambiguation), French-language newspapers

Music
 Echoes (magazine), a British music monthly
 Echoes (radio program), an American radio program
 The Echoes (American group), an American vocal trio
 The Echoes (English group)
 Echoes, Billy Joel's earliest musical group

Albums
 Echoes (Anggun album) (2011)
 Echoes (Joshua Breakstone album), 1987
 Echoes: The Retrospective, a 1993 compilation album by Camel
 Echoes (Gene Clark album) or Gene Clark with the Gosdin Brothers (1967)
 Echoes (Creep album), a 2013 album by Creep
 Echoes (Front Line Assembly album) (2014)
 Echos (Lacrimosa album) (2003)
 Echoes (Modern Jazz Quartet album) (1984)
 Echoes: The Best of Pink Floyd, a 2001 compilation album by Pink Floyd
 Echoes (the Rapture album) (2003) or its title track
 Echoes (Maggie Reilly album) (1992)
 Echoes (Livingston Taylor album) (1979)
 Echoes (Will Young album) (2011)
 Echoes (Young Guns album) (2016)
 Echoes, a 2002 album by Matt Bianco
 Echos, Chapter One, a 2005 album by Les Nubians
 Echoes, a 2019 extended play by Modestep

Songs
 "Echoes" (Pink Floyd song), 1971
 "Echoes" (Klaxons song), 2010
 "Echoes" (1950 song), by Bennie Benjamin and George David Weiss
 "Echoes", a 2013 song by August Burns Red from Rescue & Restore
 "Echoes", a 1978 song by Camel from Breathless
 "Echoes", a 2004 song by Cult of Luna from Salvation
 "Echoes", a 2015 song by Disclosure on Caracal
 "Echoes", a 1967 song by Gene Clark on Gene Clark with the Gosdin Brothers
 "Echoes", a 2008 song by God Is an Astronaut on their self-titled album
 "Echoes", a 1984 song by P-Model from Another Game
 "Echoes", a 2011 song by Riot from Immortal Soul
 "Echoes", a 2006 song by Set Your Goals from Mutiny!
 "Echoes", a 1995 song by Susumu Hirasawa from Sim City

Other uses 
 (((Echoes))) or triple parentheses, an antisemitic symbol
 Metroid Prime 2: Echoes, a 2004 video game on the Nintendo GameCube
 Fire Emblem Echoes: Shadows of Valentia, a 2017 video game for the Nintendo 3DS, a remake of Fire Emblem Gaiden
 Dragon Quest XI: Echoes of an Elusive Age, a 2017 role-playing game

See also 
 Echo (disambiguation)
 ECHO (disambiguation)
 Echos, a term in Byzantine music theory
 Echos o' Faith, a 1996 album by The 77s